is a Mongolian professional sumo wrestler from Ulaanbaatar. He made his debut in January 2004 and reached the top makuuchi division in September 2008. His highest rank has been sekiwake. He has a makushita, a jūryō and two makuuchi division championships. He has seven gold stars for defeating a yokozuna, and four special prizes, all of them coming after he turned 30 years of age. He wrestles for Kataonami stable. He has not missed a bout in his career to date and has the longest streak of consecutive matches among active wrestlers. In January 2019, he won his first top-division championship, and his second in September 2022 at the age of 37, making him the oldest winner of the top division championship since the introduction of the six tournaments a year system in 1958.

Early life and sumo background
In Mongolia, Munkh-Orgil was working toward a career in the hotel industry, but was encouraged to come to Japan by his older sister who was studying there. On a visit to see his sister in Japan, they went to Ryōgoku where Tokyo's official tournaments are held. They happened to wander by Izutsu stable and had a chance to meet the up-and-coming Mongolian sumo wrestler for that stable, Kakuryū. They talked about the prospects of Munkh-Orgil joining a stable and Kakuryū put him in touch with former senior Mongolian sumo wrestler Kyokushūzan. Through this connection, he was recruited by the former sekiwake Tamanofuji and joined Kataonami stable in January 2004.

Career

He made steady progress through the lower divisions, recording only one make-koshi (more losses than wins) on the way to the third highest makushita division in May 2005. He went up and down the division until taking the championship or yūshō in September 2007 with a perfect 7–0 record, which sent him up the ranks to makushita 2. A 4–3 record in the next tournament was enough to earn him promotion to the elite sekitori ranks for the January 2008 tournament.

After producing four consecutive kachi-koshi (more wins than losses) scores in the jūryō division, Tamawashi made his debut in the top makuuchi division in September 2008. A 4–11 record sent him back to jūryō but a 10–5 score in November returned him immediately to makuuchi. His first winning score in the top division in March 2009 saw him at his highest rank to date of maegashira 8 in the May 2009 tournament. However, he could only manage a 5–10 score at maegashira 11 in July, and was demoted back to jūryō, replaced by Masatsukasa. However, he responded by taking the jūryō championship with an 11–4 record in September, which returned him immediately to the top division. In the November 2009 tournament, he produced his best top division score so far of 10–5, which saw him promoted to maegashira 7 for the January 2010 tourney. Another kachi-koshi score of 8–7 saw him promoted to a new highest rank of maegashira 4. He was however unable to defeat any of his san'yaku opponents and had slipped back to maegashira 14 by July 2010. He responded with scores of 10–5 and 9–6 in the next two tournaments, earning him promotion to maegashira 3.

Tamawashi defeated Harumafuji in the January 2011 tournament, his first victory over an ōzeki, but finished with a 5–10 record. The tournament ended on an embarrassing note for him when he injured his right arm by leaning against and breaking the window of a restaurant in Tokyo.  He had been on a night out drinking following the final day's action, and was given a stiff warning by the Sumo Association. The injury did not affect his participation in the next tournament, which did not take place until May. However, after recording four consecutive make-koshi he dropped down to jūryō in January 2012. He made an immediate return to makuuchi for the March tournament, but fell back to jūryō on two further occasions, in September 2012 and May 2013. For the next few years he managed enough wins in tournaments to remain a fixture in the middle ranks of makuuchi.

In March 2015 he somewhat fortuitously won promotion to the san'yaku ranks for the first time, going straight to komusubi from the relatively low rank of maegashira 9 after most of the wrestlers above him made losing scores. It took him 38 tournaments from his top division debut to reach san'yaku, the slowest ever for a foreign-born wrestler. He was unable to hold on to the rank for more than a single tournament, but In May 2015 he earned his first gold star or kinboshi for an upset of a yokozuna, defeating Harumafuji. (He was also the slowest to earn a kinboshi among foreign-born wrestlers.) 2015 was the first year in his top division career that he was ranked above maegashira 10 for the whole year.

Tamawashi returned to the komusubi rank in November 2016 and produced a career-best performance as he recorded ten wins including another victory over Harumafuji and wins over three of the four ōzeki. He was rewarded with his first special prize for Technique, becoming the first wrestler since Asashoryū in 2001 to win his first special prize while ranked in san'yaku and was promoted to a career-high rank of sekiwake. The 77 career tournaments it took him to reach sekiwake is the fifth-slowest in sumo history. He is the first sekiwake from Kataonami stable since Tamanoshima in January 2004, and the first produced by the current stablemaster, the former Tamakasuga, since he took over in February 2010. Tamawashi had a winning record in his sekiwake debut and held the rank for 4 tournaments. Having never missed a bout in his career, in May 2017 he fought his 1,000th consecutive career match. Talk of a possible ōzeki promotion ended in July: despite defeating all three active ōzeki (Terunofuji, Gōeidō and Takayasu) a number of losses to lower ranked opponents saw him end with a 7–8 record. Tamawashi lost san'yaku status after another 7–8 at komusubi in September, but in the Kyushu tournament he was one of four runners-up with an 11–4 record at maegashira 1. He returned to sekiwake in January 2018 but was demoted after one tournament. However, he returned to the san'yaku ranks in July. On the final day of the tournament Tamawashi caught up to Yoshiazuma and going forward will hold the record for most consecutive matches by an active wrestler. The record was duly passed in September but a poor 4–11 score saw him drop back to the maegashira ranks. He rebounded with a 9–6 in November and began the 2019 campaign back at sekiwake.

In January 2019 Tamawashi made a solid start with three wins in his first five matches before embarking on an impressive winning streak. Having already defeated the three ōzeki he took a share of the lead by beating Hakuhō on day 12. This was his first victory over Hakuhō on his 14th attempt. He began the final day one win ahead of Takakeishō and secured his first top-division championship with a tsukiotoshi win over Endō. At 34 he became the second oldest first-time yūshō winner since the six tournaments per year system was established in 1958, after Kyokutenhō in 2012. On the day after his victory Tamawashi said "I still can’t believe it. I now believe that dreams really can come true. I want to keep going even in my 40s. If I take it one match at a time, the results will come".

Tamawashi lost his sekiwake rank after recording only five wins against ten losses in the following tournament, but a 10–5 record from maegashira 3 in May, which included a kinboshi over Kakuryū, returned him immediately to sekiwake for the July 2019 tournament. However, as in March, he could only score 5–10 at this rank. By May 2021 he had fallen to maegashira 10, his lowest rank since 2016.

Since the retirement of Kotoshōgiku in November 2020, he has been the oldest man in the top division. In May 2022 he overtook Takamiyama to reach fourth place on the all-time list of consecutive career bouts with 1426. 

Tamawashi's consecutive match streak reached 1448 matches before he was forced to withdraw from the July 2022 tournament on Day 13 due to a COVID-19 infection at Tamanoi stable. However, the Sumo Association did not regard an enforced quarantine as breaking a run of consecutive appearances as it is through no fault of the wrestler, and so Tamawashi was allowed to continue his streak in the following September tournament. By the end of that tournament he had reached 1463 consecutive matches, passing former sekiwake Takatōriki for third on the all-time list.

In 2022 Tamawashi earned three consecutive kinboshi by defeating yokozuna Terunofuji in the January, March and May tournaments. Tamawashi is the first wrestler to earn a kinboshi against the same yokozuna in three straight tournaments since Wakamisugi pulled off the feat in 1965. Tamawashi's win in January ended Terunofuji's 23-bout winning streak, while his victory in March on Day 5 would end up being Terunofuji's final contest of the tournament before pulling out. After he was beaten by the yokozuna in July, Tamawashi defeated Terunofuji again in September for his fourth kinboshi of the year, on his way to a 13-2 tournament victory. He was the first maegashira in 37 years to defeat all the yokozuna and ōzeki in a tournament. He was also the oldest to win a top division championship since the introduction of the six tournaments per year system in 1958, at the age of 37 years and 10 months. For the November 2022 tournament Tamawashi was promoted back to sanyaku for the first time since 2019, becoming at 37 year and 11 months the oldest wrestler to achieve this since Takamiyama in 1982.
During his day 9 bout againt Ura, Tamawashi used the extremely rare gasshohineri kimarite, a move not seen in the top division since 1965. He finished that tournament with a 6-9 record and was subsequently demoted to maegashira 2 in the 2023 January rankings.

At the 2023 January tournament Tamawashi achieved a 9-6 winning record.

Fighting style
Unusually for a Mongolian wrestler, Tamawashi is an oshi-sumo specialist, who prefers pushing and thrusting techniques. His most common winning kimarite is overwhelmingly oshidashi (push out), which accounts for half his career wins. He is not comfortable fighting on the mawashi, winning only around 5 percent of his matches by yorikiri (force out) in his career to date (the average is 25 percent).

Personal life
Tamawashi married a fellow Mongolian in 2012. His second child was born in January 2019, on the same day as his tournament championship was confirmed. Tamawashi is a talented baker, known for his cakes and cookies.

He has applied for Japanese citizenship, with the help of his stablemaster. In August 2021 he said he hoped to stay as a coach after retiring and "I want to give back."

Career record

See also
List of sumo tournament top division champions
List of sumo tournament top division runners-up
List of sumo tournament second division champions
List of active gold star earners
List of most consecutive bouts
Glossary of sumo terms
List of active sumo wrestlers
List of non-Japanese sumo wrestlers
List of sekiwake
Active special prize winners

References

External links

 

1984 births
Living people
Mongolian sumo wrestlers
Sportspeople from Ulaanbaatar
Sekiwake